= USPHL =

USPHL may refer to:

- Philadelphia, U.S. (UN/LOCODE geographic code)
- United States Premier Hockey League, an American junior ice hockey league
